Al-Azhar Memorial Garden is an Islamic cemetery and a business unit of the Al-Azhar Islamic Foundation (YPI Al-Azhar) that has provided Islamic funeral services since 2011.

In accordance with Islamic Shari’a, Muslim graves and non-Muslim graves should not be mixed. Therefore, Al-Azhar Memorial Garden Muslim Cemetery only serves Muslim graves. In accordance with Shari’a, a tomb must not be stepped over so the graveyard's layout includes a walkway in front of each tomb.

Background 

Indonesian people in urban areas with a growing population face the problem of increasingly limited funerals provided by the government and the community. Many residents of Jakarta are being buried outside Jakarta in cemeteries like Al-Azhar.

Purpose and objectives 

The Al-Azhar Memorial Garden was built primarily as an Islamic cemetery and includes a mosque. The layout of the cemetery is organized so that they are facing toward Mecca. There is also a garden in the cemetery.

Islamic Funerals 
The Al-Azhar Memorial Garden carries out the funeral procession relying on traditional Islamic funeral practices:

References

External links 
 Al-Azhar Memorial Garden l Official Website

Cemeteries in Java
Muslim cemeteries
Islamic gardens
Islam-related controversies
Islamic jurisprudence
Sharia
Islam in Indonesia